The 2000 Swale Borough Council election took place on 4 May 2000 to elect members of Swale Borough Council in Kent, England. One third of the council was up for election and the council remained under no overall control.

After the election, the composition of the council was:
Liberal Democrats 22
Conservative 15
Labour 12

Election result

By-elections between 2000 and 2002

References

2000
2000 English local elections
2000s in Kent